Nixon Public School was an elementary school in Norfolk County, Ontario, Canada that started out as a one room schoolhouse in the mid to late 19th century.

Summary
During the 1950s, the school was moved to a centralized building; both of these buildings were located in the hamlet of Nixon and across the street from each other. The one-room schoolhouse was sold to become a private residence and Nixon Public School became a centralized school until was closed in September 2001 due to cutbacks in education spending. After the property was put up for sale by the Grand Erie District School Board and turned down by the Brant Haldimand Norfolk Catholic District School Board, a private agriculture-related business purchased the building from the school board.

The former public school was later converted into a craft brewery and pub. "New Limburg" Brewery is owned and operated by a family from the Netherlands, who brew several different Belgian-style beers. They are open daily until 11 pm for samples and sales. http://newlimburg.com/  <ref>[http://www.simcoereformer.ca/2014/04/09/microbrewery-coming-to-nixon Microbrewery Coming to Nixon]  at The Simcoe Reformer</ref> Norfolk County council personally had to approve the land's zoning change from educational to light industrial in order for Norfolk County's third microbrewery to be possible according to their set of by-laws. Some of the chalkboards from the old Nixon Public School have been preserved and service is available even in the coldest winter months. The beers served at this establishment range from being of average quality to excellent quality. Most customers spend less than 60 minutes in this establishment.

Most of its students lived an area that surrounded the communities of Lynnville, Atherton, Hillcrest, and Blayney. Children from the communities of Gilbertville and Pine Grove only attended Nixon Public School because neither Delhi Public School nor Walsh Public School had a special education program during the 1980s.

Standard detentions were rarely used even in the intermediate grades and were never given to special education students. Compared to most elementary schools of its time, Nixon Public School was one of the safest schools when it came to bullying. Mrs. Virginia Chambers was the school's librarian before she was promoted to become the last principal of Nixon Public School. Like most elementary school libraries, the Nixon Public School library had children's books and a limited amount of dictionaries and encyclopedias for the older students.

Kindergarten was introduced to Nixon Public School in the 1960s to help better prepare students for the first grade. Special education was introduced in the 1970s when schools began integrating the handicapped students with other children. The last program to be introduced was junior kindergarten in the late 1990s. One of the goals of the junior kindergarten program was to better prepare students for the challenges of kindergarten according to the curriculum of the 21st century. The other goal of the junior kindergarten program was to ultimately prepare the children for a more competitive workplace environment by offering them more academia at a younger age.

Special education
Special education was introduced in the 1970s and was taught freestyle at this school. Instead of having the disabled students sit in rows, they sat in special areas with special activities being the reward for doing successful work. For example, the tape recorder had a built-in microphone for children to record their own voice on a Compact Cassette. Any surviving cassette tapes, drawings, and daily journal entries would serve today as mementos of a child's Nixon Public School years. Many parents have kept pictures that their children drew while in Nixon Public School. However, cassettes have typically been either taped over or placed in the garbage after a certain number of years. Students who misbehaved in special education got sent to the time out corner, which was a yellowish chair facing the southwest corner of the room.

Mrs. McCall once taught religious studies to the disabled children in special education class prior to the Ontario government banning prayer in public schools in the early 1990s. Her presence in the late 1980s helped to complement a more Christian thinking in the Ontario public school administration of that time. Through religious songs and stories from the Bible, the focus was on getting the children to pay attention to stories while expanding their attention span and improving eye contact with the person who was telling the story. In order to make up for a lack of religious studies programs in the 1990s onwards, a Key Bible Club program was installed in most Ontario public schools.

Activities
Typical activities of children who attended the special education class included language comprehension through the DLM Series, educational play in the sandbox, taking care of the classroom's companion pets, and learning how to operate two different kinds of personal computers. During the late 1980s and early 1990s, those two computers were an Apple II and a Commodore 64. The Apple II had a Sesame Street program and a Summer Olympics program for activity time while the Commodore 64 had more educational programs. One of the programs was a tic-tac-toe game that taught the students addition, subtraction, multiplication, and division. Other programs taught the basics of the English language like phonics and spelling. During activity time, children could write on the chalkboard except for the one near the teacher's desk; that specific chalkboard was exclusively used by teachers and the educational assistants.

Life after special education
By the year 1999, the special education program was renamed the multi-exceptional class in order to fully define the spectrum of the students' disabilities from very mild to very severe. In the 1999-2000 school years, there were 14 special needs students who attended the multi-exceptional class at Nixon Public School. Those 14 students represented 22% (or 2.2 out of every 10 students) of the Nixon Public School student population during the 1999-2000 school years. Most graduates of the Nixon Public School special education system either live with their relatives or in a group home setting as of the year 2009.

Institutions were once considered to be places to find adults who once attended the special education program. However, the last institution in Ontario was officially closed on April 1, 2009, with a celebration of freedom for those who were locked in there for years. Since then, the alumni that were in institutions have been transferred to family homes and community housing with the help of the Norfolk Association for Community Living''.

References

Educational institutions disestablished in 2001
Educational institutions in Canada with year of establishment missing
Elementary schools in Norfolk County, Ontario